Oscar Eramus Lanford III (January 6, 1940 – November 16, 2013) was an American mathematician working on mathematical physics and dynamical systems theory.

Professional career
Born in New York, Lanford was awarded his undergraduate degree from Wesleyan University and the Ph.D. from Princeton University in 1966 under the supervision of Arthur Wightman.  He has served as a professor of mathematics at the University of California, Berkeley, and a professor of physics at the Institut des Hautes Études Scientifiques (IHES) in Bures-sur-Yvette, France (1982-1989).  Since 1987,  he was with the department of mathematics, Swiss Federal Institute of Technology Zürich (ETH Zürich) till his retirement. After his 
retirement, he taught occasionally in New York University.

Proof of the rigidity conjectures
Lanford gave the first proof that the Feigenbaum-Cvitanovic functional equation

has an even analytic solution g and that this fixed point g of the Feigenbaum renormalisation operator T is hyperbolic with a one-dimensional unstable manifold. This provided the first mathematical proof of the rigidity conjectures of Feigenbaum. The proof was computer assisted. The hyperbolicity of the fixed point is essential to explain the Feigenbaum universality observed experimentally by Mitchell Feigenbaum and Coullet-Tresser.  Feigenbaum has studied the logistic family and looked at the sequence of Period doubling bifurcations. Amazingly the asymptotic behavior near the accumulation point appeared universal in the sense that the same numerical values would appear. The logistic family  of maps on the interval [0,1] for example would lead to the same asymptotic law of the ratio of the differences  between the bifurcation values a(n) than
. The result is that  converges to  the Feigenbaum constants  which is a "universal number" independent of the map f. The bifurcation diagram has become an icon of chaos theory.

Campanino and Epstein also gave a proof of the fixed point without computer assistance but did not establish its hyperbolicity. They cite in their paper Lanfords computer assisted proof. There are also lecture notes of Lanford from 1979 in Zurich and announcements in 1980. The hyperbolicity is essential to verify the picture discovered numerically by Feigenbaum and independently by Coullet and Tresser. Lanford later gave a shorter proof using the Leray-Schauder fixed point theorem but establishing only the fixed point without the hyperbolicity. Lyubich published in 1999 the first not computer assisted proof which also establishes hyperbolicity. Work of Sullivan later showed that the fixed point is unique in the class of real valued quadratic like germs.

Awards and honors
Lanford was the recipient of the 1986 United States National Academy of Sciences award in Applied Mathematics and Numerical Analysis and holds an honorary doctorate from Wesleyan University.

In 2012 he became a fellow of the American Mathematical Society.

Selected publications

See also
Dobrushin-Lanford-Ruelle equations

References

 
 
 
 
 
 
 
 
ETH Who's who accessed on April 29, 2007 through

External links
Home page of Oscar E. Lanford III

Wesleyan University alumni
Princeton University alumni
University of California, Berkeley College of Letters and Science faculty
20th-century American mathematicians
2013 deaths
Fellows of the American Mathematical Society
1940 births
Academic staff of ETH Zurich